Jeong Cheol (Hangul: 정철, Hanja: 鄭澈; 18 December 1536 – 7 February 1594) was a Korean statesman and poet. He used the pen-names Gyeham (계함) and Songgang (송강), and studied under Kim Yunjae at Hwanbyeokdang. He was expelled by the Easterners. He was from the Yeonil Jeong clan (연일 정씨, 延日 鄭氏).

Family 
 Grandfather
 Jeong Woe (정위, 鄭潙)
 Father
 Jeong Yu-chim (정유침, 鄭惟沈)
 Mother
 Lady Ahn of the Juksan Ahn clan (죽산 안씨, 竹山 安氏)
 Siblings
 Older brother - Jeong So (정소, 鄭沼)
 Older sister - Royal Consort Gwi-in of the Yeonil Jeong clan (귀인 정씨) (August 1520 - 25 March 1566)
 Brother-in-law - King Injong of Joseon (조선 인종) (10 March 1515 - 7 August 1545)
 Older sister - Princess Consort Ohcheon of the Yeonil Jeong clan (오천군부인 연일 정씨, 烏川郡夫人 延日 鄭氏)
 Brother-in-law - Yi Yu, Prince Gyerim (계림군 유, 桂林君 瑠) 
 Nephew - Yi Si (연양정 이시, 延陽正 李諟)
 Wives and their children
 Lady Ryu of the Munhwa Ryu clan (문화 류씨, 文化 柳氏)
 Son - Jeong Ki-myeong (정기명, 鄭振溟) (? - 1589)
 Grandson - Jeong Woon (정운, 鄭沄)
 Son - Jeong Jong-myeong (정종명, 鄭宗溟)
 Grandson - Jeong Jik (정직, 鄭溭)
 Grandson - Jeong Su (정수, 鄭洙)
 Grandson - Jeong Yeon (정연, 鄭沇)
 Grandson - Jeong Yang (정양, 鄭瀁) (1600 - 1662)
 Grandson - Jeong Jeon (정전, 鄭淟)
 Son - Jeong Jin-myeong (정진명, 鄭振溟)
 Son - Jeong Hong-myeong (정홍명, 鄭弘溟) (7 March 1582 - 2 October 1650)
 Grandson - Jeong Yi (정이, 鄭涖)
 Concubine - Jin-ok (기녀 진옥, 眞玉)
 Concubine - Lady Kang-ah (강아, 江娥)

Literary works
He is prominent in the gasa and the sijo, which are forms of classical Korean poetry.

The following two poems are an exchange between Jeong Cheol and the gisaeng Jinok. Jeong is playing on Jinok's name, which means Genuine Gem. First he calls her a gem (ok; 玉), then suggests she is an imitation (beon-ok; 燔玉) and finally finds her to be genuine (jin-ok; 眞玉). 

Jinok replies by playing on the name of Jeong Cheol (鄭澈), first calling him iron (cheol; 鐵), then suggesting he might be false iron (seop-cheol; 攝鐵) and finally discovering he is genuine iron (jeong cheol; 正鐵). Unquestionably bawdy, this exchange is one of the finest examples of satire in sijo — a poetic form that placed high value on wit, double entendre and word play.

Other Works:

 Gwandong Byeolgok (The Song of the Sceneries of the Gwandong).
 Samiingok (Mindful of My Seemly Lord).
 Songgang Gasa (Songgang's Prose Poetry Book).

Popular culture
Portrayed by Park-woong in the 1995 KBS2 TV Series West Palace.
 Portrayed by Joo Jin-mo in the 2014 KBS2 TV series The King's Face.
 Portrayed by Sun Dong-Hyuk in the 2015 KBS2 TV series The Jingbirok: A Memoir of Imjin War.

Legacy
A crater on Mercury was named after him in 1979.

See also
Korean literature
List of Koreans
Joseon Dynasty

References

1536 births
1594 deaths
Korean politicians
Korean male poets
16th-century Korean poets